Rondeletia loricata is a species of redmouth whalefish found in the temperate and tropical oceans at depths of from . It is known to be a vertical migrant, occurring at shallower depths at night.

References

Cetomimiformes
Taxa named by Tokiharu Abe
Fish described in 1963